Chitonodytes is a genus of gastrotrichs belonging to the family Dasydytidae.

Species:

Chitonodytes collini 
Chitonodytes longisetosus 
Chitonodytes longispinosus

References

Gastrotricha